St. Mary's College, Thrissur 	is an educational and research institution for women established in 1946 in Kerala state, India. The college is managed by the CMC Educational Society of Nirmala Province of the Congregation of the Mother of Carmel in the Syro Malabar Catholic Church, the college is under the jurisdiction of the Syro Malabar Catholic Bishop of Thrissur.

History 
The sisters of the Congregation of the Mother of Carmel entered the field of university education in 1946 with the inception of St. Mary's College, Thrissur. It is the pioneer First Grade women's college in the district. It soon grew into a full-fledged First Grade college with two postgraduate courses in economics and English literature.

In 1967, St. Mary's was bifurcated, the pre-degree section remaining in Thrissur and the undergraduate and postgraduate sections being shifted to Vimala College, Cheroor.

In 1979 St. Mary's once again regained its status as a First Grade college with the starting of B.A., B.Sc. courses. Postgraduate courses in mathematics and history were introduced in 1995 and 1998 respectively.

During 1981 to 1982 a new college, Carmel College, was started under the management of the CMC Educational Society. After the trifurcation in 1987, St. Mary's and Vimala Colleges were still under the CMC Educational Society, Thrissur, which have a creditable history in the field of education. In 1998, delinking of the pre-degree courses started and was completed in 2001.

Later, B.Sc courses in polymer chemistry (1999), biotechnology (2000), microbiology (2001) and B.C.A (2001) were introduced. Postgraduate courses in microbiology, biotechnology and computer science were started in 2002, 2003 and 2004 respectively.

National Assessment and Accreditation Council (NAAC), an autonomous institution of the University Grants Commission, placed the college at the A+ level in 2009.

The college celebrated its Diamond Jubilee in 2006.

Library Collection 
It has a collection of more than 49,000 books, periodicals, video and audio cassettes, and 50 CD-ROMs.  The Library collection includes many dictionaries and encyclopedias.

Services of the Library 
The Library has launched a digital library with a digital collection of rare books and palm leaves.  Old question papers, St.Mary's College magazines, Publications and dissertations of the faculty of St.Mary's College are also available there. For more details please go the link given. http://111.92.84.71:8080/jspui/ The library also gives services to outside libraries and such other institutions to digitize their collection on demand. St.Mary's College Library is using KOHA the world's first free and open source software for library system management.  The members of St.Mary's College also can have access to the e-resources provided by the UGC INFLIBNET Centre https://en.wikipedia.org/wiki/INFLIBNET_Centre.  To go to the home page of N-List please click the link given http://nlist.inflibnet.ac.in/

Hostel 
The college hostel provides accommodation to students who come from distant places. Other students who do not live with relatives or guardians live in hostels approved by college authorities. The college hostel can house up to 300 students, and is under the direct control of the principal (who stands as the local guardian to all in residence) and under the immediate management of the warden.

Canteen 
The college canteen serves both vegetarian and non-vegetarian snacks and meals and has an ice cream parlour.

Sports 
The college has indoor facilities for table tennis, chess, and carroms, as well as courts for kho kho, ball badminton, and kabaddi.

Partial academic courses 
At its inception in 1946, the college had two degree courses and two intermediate courses. St. Mary's now has 23 departments.
 English
 Hindi
 Sanskrit
 Malayalam
 Mathematics
 Physics
 Biochemistry
 Chemistry
 Psychology
 Commerce
 Biotechnology
 Botany
 Zoology
 Microbiology
 History
 Economics
 Physical Education
 Sociology
 Computer Science / Computer Applications
 Bioinformatics
 Management studies
 Social work
 Bachelor of vocational - B. Voc

References

External links
 Official website

Catholic universities and colleges in India
Women's universities and colleges in Kerala
Arts and Science colleges in Kerala
Colleges affiliated with the University of Calicut
Colleges in Thrissur
Educational institutions established in 1946
1946 establishments in India
Academic institutions formerly affiliated with the University of Madras